Hrvatski nogometni klub Čapljina  (English: Croat Football Club Čapljina) is a professional association football club from the city of Čapljina that is situated in Bosnia and Herzegovina. 

Čapljina currently plays in the Second League of the Federation of Bosnia and Herzegovina and plays its home matches on the Bjelave Stadium which has a capacity of 1,000 seats.

Honours

Domestic

League
First League of the Federation of Bosnia and Herzegovina:
Runners-up (1): 2010–11
Second League of the Federation of Bosnia and Herzegovina:
Winners (2): 2007–08 , 2009–10

Club seasons

Managerial history
 Tomislav Raguž (3 September 2012 – 28 May 2013)
 Zlatko Krizanović (28 May 2013 – 30 June 2013)
 Damir Borovac (30 June 2013 – 31 July 2014)
 Dario Zadro (31 July 2014 – 10 September 2014)
 Zlatko Krizanović (10 September 2014 – 15 November 2014)
 Damir Borovac (24 May 2015 – 9 October 2016)
 Tomislav Raguž (10 October 2016 – 7 March 2017)
 Damir Beća (9 March 2017 – 27 August 2017) 
 Damir Borovac (29 August 2017 – 16 April 2019)
 Tomislav Raguž (17 April 2019 – 10 June 2019)
 Dragan Radović (2 July 2019 – 27 October 2020)
 Damir Borovac (5 November 2020 – present)

References

External links
HNK Čapljina at Facebook

Football clubs in Bosnia and Herzegovina
Croatian football clubs in Bosnia and Herzegovina
Sport in the Federation of Bosnia and Herzegovina
Association football clubs established in 1993
1993 establishments in Bosnia and Herzegovina